Janet Scott may refer to:
 Janet Scott, Lady Ferniehirst, Scottish landowner
 Janet G. Scott, Scottish scholar of English and French literature
 Janet Scott (1964–2022), South African chemist
 Janet Scott, lead character on the British TV series Scott & Bailey

See also
 Janette Scott, English actress